Lance Earl Deal (born August 21, 1961 in Riverton, Wyoming) is a former American athlete who won a silver medal in the hammer throw in the 1996 Summer Olympics in Atlanta, Georgia. He also competed in the 1988, 1992, and 2000 Summer Olympics.

In the hammer throw finals at the 1996 Olympic Games, only the top eight competitors after three throws were awarded three additional throws. Deal fouled his first two throws; his third equaled the eighth longest throw of the competition. However, he was only in ninth place, because the other competitor had a second legal throw. The announcer initially stated that, on the basis of that tiebreaker, Deal was out of the rest of the competition. The officials corrected the error, however; IAAF rules do not call for breaking ties in this case. So Deal advanced, and on his sixth and final throw, won the silver medal behind Balázs Kiss of Hungary.

Later in the season, he threw  to win the IAAF Grand Prix Final.  24 years later, in 2020, that throw was ratified as the American Masters M35 record.  That mark would also be a World Record if it is ever ratified by WMA.

Deal graduated from Natrona County High School in Casper, Wyoming where he earned All-State Honors in football, wrestling, and track.  He went on to graduate from Montana State University in Bozeman, Montana. He currently works at the University of Oregon as the Director of Track & Field Venues and Program Support.  He was the throws coach (for discus, hammer, javelin, and shot put) at the University of Oregon until 2010. Deal is married and has one daughter.

Deal was inducted into the Oregon Sports Hall of Fame on September 25, 2007. He was also inducted into the Wyoming Sports Hall of Fame in 2002.  In 2014, he was elected into the National Track and Field Hall of Fame.

Achievements

References

External links
 
 
 
 

1961 births
American male hammer throwers
Living people
Olympic silver medalists for the United States in track and field
Athletes (track and field) at the 1988 Summer Olympics
Athletes (track and field) at the 1992 Summer Olympics
Athletes (track and field) at the 1996 Summer Olympics
Athletes (track and field) at the 2000 Summer Olympics
Athletes (track and field) at the 1995 Pan American Games
Athletes (track and field) at the 1999 Pan American Games
Track and field athletes from Oregon
Track and field athletes from Wyoming
People from Riverton, Wyoming
Male weight throwers
Montana State Bobcats men's track and field athletes
Medalists at the 1996 Summer Olympics
Pan American Games gold medalists for the United States
Pan American Games medalists in athletics (track and field)
Goodwill Games medalists in athletics
Competitors at the 1998 Goodwill Games
Competitors at the 1994 Goodwill Games
Medalists at the 1995 Pan American Games
Medalists at the 1999 Pan American Games